In Broad Daylight is a Canadian drama film, directed by Emmanuel Tardif and released in 2022. The film centres on a reclusive wealthy family who have spent months living in virtual isolation in the family mansion to prevent their community from finding out that daughter Hélène (Amaryllis Tremblay) has gotten pregnant from a one-night stand, only to have their fragile equilibrium challenged when Hélène leaves the house soon after the baby's birth to look for the father.

The cast also includes Karine Gonthier-Hyndman and David Savard as Hélène's parents, Elijah Patrice as her brother, Marianne Fortier as a relative mystified by her family's lack of contact, and Jean-Simon Leduc as Antonin, the baby's father.

The film entered production in 2020 in Saint-Paul-d'Abbotsford, Quebec.

It premiered in the Proxima competition for emerging filmmakers at the 56th Karlovy Vary International Film Festival in July 2022. It had its Canadian premiere at the 2022 Cinéfest Sudbury International Film Festival in September, and its Quebec premiere at the Cinemania film festival in November. At Cinemania, the film received an honorable mention from the Jury Prize jury.

Commercial release was slated for April 2023, but was cancelled in January after Tardif was arrested for allegedly murdering his mother.

References

External links
 

2022 films
2020s French-language films
French-language Canadian films
Films set in Quebec
Films shot in Quebec
Canadian drama films
2022 drama films
2020s Canadian films
Quebec films